The Bank of Burbank was a bank in Burbank, Oklahoma, and its historic bank building survives.  The building was built in 1910.  The bank operated through the Great Depression, and continued in business until 1948, when the bank ceased operating. The building was used for 30 years as the Burbank post office, and subsequently was renovated for use as a private residence. It was listed on the National Register of Historic Places in 1984.

The building is a single-story small commercial building, built of native sandstone and having a coursed ashlar finish. It has a flat roof with a parapet about  surrounding on all sides but the rear.

It is one of four small bank buildings built in Richardsonian Romanesque style in Osage County, Oklahoma, during 1904–1911. The others are Bank of Hominy, Bank of Bigheart, and Osage Bank of Fairfax.

The building stands alone, with no adjoining buildings, on the northwest corner of First St. and McCorkle St. in Burbank.

References

Bank buildings on the National Register of Historic Places in Oklahoma
Buildings and structures in Osage County, Oklahoma
Richardsonian Romanesque architecture in Oklahoma
1910 establishments in Oklahoma
1948 disestablishments in Oklahoma
National Register of Historic Places in Osage County, Oklahoma